Reversed-phase chromatography (also called RPC, reverse-phase chromatography, or hydrophobic chromatography) includes any chromatographic method that uses a hydrophobic  stationary phase.
RPC refers to liquid (rather than gas) chromatography.

Stationary phases  
In the 1970s, most liquid chromatography was performed using a solid support stationary phase (also called a column) containing unmodified silica or alumina resins. This type of technique is now referred to as normal-phase chromatography.  Since the stationary phase is hydrophilic in this technique, molecules with hydrophilic properties contained within the mobile phase will have a high affinity for the stationary phase, and therefore will adsorb to the column packing. Hydrophobic molecules experience less of an affinity for the column packing, and will pass through to be eluted and detected first. Elution of the hydrophilic molecules adsorbed to the column packing requires the use of more hydrophilic or more polar solvents in the mobile phase to shift the distribution of the particles in the stationary phase towards that of the mobile phase. 

Reversed-phase chromatography is a technique using hydrophobic molecules covalently bonded to the stationary phase particles in order to create a hydrophobic stationary phase, which has a stronger affinity for hydrophobic or less polar compounds. The use of a hydrophobic stationary phase is essentially the reverse of normal phase chromatography, since the polarity of the mobile and stationary phases have been inverted – hence the term reversed-phase chromatography. Reversed-phase chromatography employs a polar (aqueous) mobile phase. As a result, hydrophobic molecules in the polar mobile phase tend to adsorb to the hydrophobic stationary phase, and hydrophilic molecules in the mobile phase will pass through the column and are eluted first. Hydrophobic molecules can be eluted from the column by decreasing the polarity of the mobile phase using an organic (non-polar) solvent, which reduces hydrophobic interactions.  The more hydrophobic the molecule, the more strongly it will bind to the stationary phase, and the higher the concentration of organic solvent that will be required to elute the molecule.

Many of the mathematical and experimental considerations used in other chromatographic methods also apply to RPC (for example, the separation resolution is dependent on the length of the column). It can be used for the separation of a wide variety of molecules. It is typically used for separation of proteins, because the organic solvents used in normal-phase chromatography can denature many proteins.  

Today, RPC is a frequently used analytical technique. There are a variety of stationary phases available for use in RPC, allowing great flexibility in the development of separation methods.

Silica-based stationary phases
Any inert polar substance that achieves sufficient packing can be used for reversed-phase chromatography. The most popular column is an octadecyl carbon chain (C18)-bonded silica (USP classification L1). This is followed by C8-bonded silica (L7), pure silica (L3), cyano-bonded silica (L10) and phenyl-bonded silica (L11). Note that C18, C8 and phenyl are dedicated reversed-phase resins, while cyano columns can be used in a reversed-phase mode depending on analyte and mobile phase conditions. Not all C18 columns have identical retention properties. Surface functionalization of silica can be performed in a monomeric or a polymeric reaction with different short-chain organosilanes used in a second step to cover remaining silanol groups (end-capping). While the overall retention mechanism remains the same, subtle differences in the surface chemistries of different stationary phases will lead to changes in selectivity.

Modern columns have different polarity. PFP is pentafluorphenyl. CN is cyano. NH2 is amino. ODS is octadecyl or C18. ODCN is a mixed mode column consisting of C18 and nitrile. SCX is strong cationic exchange (used for separation of organic amines). SAX is strong anionic exchange (used for separation of carboxylic acid compounds).

Mobile phases
Mixtures of water or aqueous buffers and organic solvents are used to elute analytes from a reversed-phase column. The solvents must be miscible with water, and the most common organic solvents used are acetonitrile, methanol, and tetrahydrofuran (THF). Other solvents can be used such as ethanol or 2-propanol (isopropyl alcohol). Elution can be performed isocratically (the water-solvent composition does not change during the separation process) or by using a solution gradient (the water-solvent composition changes during the separation process, usually by decreasing the polarity). The pH of the mobile phase can have an important role on the retention of an analyte and can change the selectivity of certain analytes.

Charged analytes can be separated on a reversed-phase column by the use of ion-pairing (also called ion-interaction). This technique is known as reversed-phase ion-pairing chromatography.

See also
Aqueous normal-phase chromatography

References

External links 
 Tables summarizing different types of reverse phases, and information on the functionalization process

Chromatography